Palladium(II) sulfide is a chemical compound of palladium and sulfur with the chemical formula PdS. Like other palladium and platinum chalcogenides, palladium(II) sulfide has complex structural, electrical and magnetic properties.

Preparation
Palladium(II) sulfide is formed when hydrogen sulfide is passed through an aqueous solution containing palladium in the +2 oxidation state:

Pd2+ + H2S → PdS + 2H+

Berzelius reacted palladium directly with sulfur to produce palladium(II) sulfide in 1813:

Pd + S → PdS

Structure
The crystal structure of PdS contains approximately square planar palladium centres and tetrahedral sulfur centres.

Reactivity
If palladium(II) sulfide is heated with an excess of sulfur, palladium disulfide is formed:

PdS + S → PdS2

Related compounds
A variety of other compounds in the Pd-S system have been reported, including Pd4S, Pd2.8S, Pd2.2S and PdS2. The mineral Braggite has the composition (Pt, Pd, Ni)S and is isomorphous with PdS.

See also
 Cooperite
 Verbeekite
 Merenskyite
 Platinum disulfide
 Platinum diselenide

References

Palladium compounds
Sulfides